Bennett Frederick "Peewee" Howe (30 August 1932 – 22 April 2010) was a South African rugby union player and first-class cricketer. He played in two first-class matches for Border in 1955/56.

Rugby union career
Howe was born in Port Nolloth in Natal and attended Dale College Boys' High School in the Eastern Cape.

He toured with the Springboks to Australia and New Zealand in 1956. He played in the  first and last test matches against , scoring a try on test debut.

Test history

See also
 List of South Africa national rugby union players – Springbok no. 330
 List of Border representative cricketers

References

External links
 

1932 births
2010 deaths
South African cricketers
Border cricketers
South African rugby union players
South Africa international rugby union players
Border Bulldogs players
Rugby union players from the Northern Cape
Rugby union centres
Rugby union fly-halves